The Skwentna River (Dena'ina: Shqitnu) is a river in the southwestern part of Matanuska-Susitna Borough, Alaska.

History
Tanaina Indian name reported in 1898 by Spurr (1900,p. 48), USGS, as "Skwent River."

Watershed

Tributaries
Talachulitna River

See also
List of rivers of Alaska

References

Rivers of Matanuska-Susitna Borough, Alaska
Rivers of Alaska